This is the discography for American country musician Red Foley.

Albums

Singles

References 

Country music discographies
Discographies of American artists